Lawrence C. "Larry" Levy is a former journalist and the current executive dean of the National Center for Suburban Studies at Hofstra University.

Levy worked as a reporter, columnist and editorial writer at Newsday from 1977 to 2007. He has also served as the host of "Face-Off" on WLIW.

In 1999, he was a finalist for the Pulitzer Prize for Editorial Writing. He has written guest posts for CNN and the New York Times. He has appeared as a guest on WCNY-FM, Innovation Hub, WNYC, and others.

He was born in 1950 and is the son of Celia "Cyl" and Saul Levy. He is married to Freda Wagner. He has two sons, David and Sam. He has a sister Mara Kahn who is a Realtor in Sonoma, California. He grew up in Valley Stream, NY.

He attended Boston University, where he majored in journalism. He was a starting pitcher on the baseball team.

References

Living people
Year of birth missing (living people)